Vyškov is a town in the South Moravian Region of the Czech Republic. It has about 20,000 inhabitants. The historic town centre is well preserved and is protected by law as an urban monument zone.

Administrative parts
Vyškov is made up of town parts and villages of Vyškov-Město, Vyškov-Předměstí, Brňany, Dědice, Hamiltony, Křečkovice, Lhota, Nosálovice, Nouzka, Opatovice, Pařezovice, Pazderna and Rychtářov.

Geography
It lies mostly in the Vyškov Gate. The Haná River, formed by the confluence of the Velká Haná and Malá Haná streams in Dědice, flows through the town.

Opatovice Reservoir was built on the Malá Haná in 1972. It serves primarily for water supply.

History

The first written mention of Vyškov is from 1141, in a deed of bishop Jindřich Zdík. It was located on crossroads of trade routes from Brno to Olomouc and Kroměříž. In the first half of the 13th century, it was acquired by Olomouc bishops, who owned it for more than 600 years. In the mid-13th century, Vyškov was promoted to a town.

Vyškov was fortified in the mid-14th century and the stone walls were built in the 15th century. During the Hussite Wars, the town was conquered and ravaged by the Hussites. The town recovered during the rule of bishop Tas of Černá Hora in the second half of the 15th century. In the 16th and early 17th centuries, Vyškov prospered and crafts developed.

Vyškov was severely damaged by the Thirty Years' War. The town was twice conquered by the Swedish troops and in 1643 it was completely plundered. Only about a third of the houses and residents survived. Vyškov again recovered, and achieved the greatest development during the rule of Karl II von Liechtenstein-Kastelkorn in the late 17th century. He had rebuilt and extended the local castle and the castle garden. In that time, Vyškov earned the nickname "Moravian Versailles".

In 1753, the town and the castle were burned down by a large fire. The castle never reached its past glory again, even though it was a meeting place of Emperors Alexander I of Russia and Francis II before the Battle of Austerlitz in 1805. After the Napoleonic Wars, the town expanded and the fortifications were partially demolished.

Vyškov was one of the most affected towns by the World War II in the country. It was liberated from German control on 30 April 1945, but the German army merely retreated to the hills around the town and bombed it almost continuously until victory was declared on 9 May.

A Jewish family in the town was first documented in the early 14th century, however, throughout history, Jews have been expelled from the town several times and a continuous settlement did not emerge until the mid-19th century. The Jewish community was established in 1891, but after it ceased to exist during the Holocaust during the World War II, it was not restored.

Until the World War II, Vyškov belonged to the smaller Moravian towns, and Brňany, Dědice, Křečkovice and Nosálovice were separate municipalities. Hamiltony and Pazderna were administered as parts of Dědice, which had the title of a market town, and Nouzka was a part of Nosálovice. In 1941–1942, they all became administrative parts of Vyškov. In 1945, the secession of Brňany, Dědice and Křečkovice was rejected by the Local Committee of Vyškov. Efforts to make these parts independent continued in the following years, but unsuccessfully. Opatovice was incorporated into Vyškov in 1980; Lhota, Pařezovice and Rychtářov were incorporated in 1986.

Demographics

Economy
The Czech branch of Lear Corporation has its headquarters and one of the production plants in Vyškov.

Sport
Vyškov has a top-level rugby team RC Vyškov, which plays in the KB Extraliga and has become national champions 14 times.

The town is home to the football club MFK Vyškov.

Sights

The Vyškov Castle was originally a Gothic castle, rebuilt into the current form in 1665–1682. Today it houses the regional museum. The museum is known for its extensive collection folk ceramics, which was produced in Vyškov from the beginning of the 18th century until 1945. The castle includes a castle garden. The architectural landmark of the garden is the loggia from 1673.

In the historic centre of Vyškov is the triangle-shaped Masarykovo Square. Its landmark is the Renaissance town hall, built in 1569. It has stucco decoration from the 18th century. In the middle of the square are a Marian column, a fountain and a well. The marian column comes from 1719. The Baroque fountain was created in the 18th century and has motif of Ganymede on an eagle. The well is from 1839.

Church of the Assumption of the Virgin Mary is the main church of Vyškov. The original late Gothic church was built in 1464–1466 and baroque rebuilt in 1773. A Gothic portal from the original church has been preserved. The Chapel of Saint Odile was added in 1692.

The historic centre was delimited by the town walls, the remains of which have been preserved to this day. The town gates were demolished.

The Jewish community is commemorated by the Jewish cemetery and the neo-Romanesque building of the former synagogue. The synagogue is atypically located on the town square.

The Vyškov Zoo was opened in 1965. It is one of the most visited attractions in the region.

In 2006, a Dinopark was opened in Vyškov. It shows life-size dinosaur models.

Notable people

Andreas Zelinka (1802–1868), mayor of Vienna (1851–1860)
Alois Musil (1868–1944), Austrian-Czech theologist, orientalist, explorer and writer
Jan Jelínek (1893–1974), legionnaire and writer
Jan Koutný (1897–1976), gymnast, Olympic medalist
Helena Bochořáková-Dittrichová (1894–1980), illustrator and graphic novelist
Otto Planetta (1899–1934), Austrian Nazi politician who murdered Engelbert Dollfuss
Karel Kachyňa (1924–2004), film director
Antonín Tučapský (1928–2014), composer
Boris Hybner (1941–2016), actor and mime
Josef Mazura (born 1956), football player and manager
Michal Grošek (born 1975), ice hockey player
Lada Kozlíková (born 1979), cyclist
Michal Barinka (born 1984), ice hockey player
Michal Kadlec (born 1984), footballer
Albert Rusnák (born 1994), Slovak footballer

Twin towns – sister cities

Vyškov is twinned with:
 Cognac, France
 Döbeln, Germany
 Jarosław, Poland
 Michalovce, Slovakia
 Virovitica, Croatia

References

External links

 
Cities and towns in the Czech Republic
Populated places in Vyškov District